Erik Kugelberg (March 9, 1891 – October 15, 1975) was a Swedish track and field athlete who competed in the 1912 Summer Olympics. In 1912 he finished eighth in the decathlon competition. In the pentathlon competition he retired after three events.

References

External links
Profile

1891 births
1975 deaths
Swedish decathletes
Olympic athletes of Sweden
Athletes (track and field) at the 1912 Summer Olympics
Olympic decathletes